North Dakota Highway 200 Alternate (Alt. Alt. ND 200's western terminus is at ND 18 southwest of Hillsboro, and the eastern terminus is at ND 200 south of Hillsboro.

Major intersections

References

200
Transportation in Traill County, North Dakota